Schwarzman is a surname, and may refer to:
 Alexander Schwarzman (born 1967), Russian international draughts grandmaster
 Alice P. Schwarzman, character in the comic strip Doonesbury
 Howie Schwarzman (born 1927), American magician
Marguerite Engler Schwarzman (1892–1985), American librarian, educator, writer, activist
 Stephen A. Schwarzman (born 1947), co-founder of the Blackstone Group private-equity firm
 Ted Schwarzman (born 1946) a former Australian rules footballer
 Teddy Schwarzman (born 1979) an American film produce

See also 
 Schwarzmann
 Schwartzman
 Schwartzmann

German-language surnames
Jewish surnames

ru:Шварцман